Juan Ignacio Chela was the defending champion, but lost in the second round to Agustín Calleri.

Sixth-seeded Nicolás Almagro won in the final 6–1, 7–6(7–1), against David Nalbandian.

Seeds

Draw

Finals

Top half

Bottom half

External links
 Draw
 Qualifying draw

2008 Abierto Mexicano Telcel
Abierto Mexicano Telcel